Gare Montparnasse (Montparnasse station), officially Paris-Montparnasse, one of the six large Paris railway termini, is located in the 14th and 15th arrondissements.

The station opened in 1840, was rebuilt in 1852 and relocated in 1969 to a new station just south of the original location – where subsequently the prominent Montparnasse Tower was constructed. It is a central element to the Montparnasse area. The original station is noted for the Montparnasse derailment, where a steam train crashed through the station in 1895, an event captured in widely known photographs – and reproduced in full scale in several locations.

The station serves intercity TGV trains to the west and southwest of France including Tours, Bordeaux, Rennes and Nantes, and suburban and regional services on the Transilien Paris – Montparnasse routes. There is also a metro station. Gare Montparnasse is the only mainline terminus in Paris not directly connected to the RER system, though the Montparnasse main line is connected to the RER at Versailles-Chantiers and the LGV Atlantique at Massy Palaiseau.

History
The station opened in 1840 as Gare de l'Ouest, later being renamed. A second station was built between 1848 and 1852.

On 25 August 1944, the German military governor of Paris, General von Choltitz, surrendered his garrison to the French General Philippe Leclerc at the old station. (see Liberation of Paris).

During the 1960s, a newer station integrated into a complex of office buildings was built further down the track. In 1969, the old station was demolished and the Tour Montparnasse built on its site. An extension was built in 1990 to host the TGV Atlantique.

1895 derailment

The Gare Montparnasse became famous for the derailment on 22 October 1895, of the Granville–Paris Express, which overran the buffer stop. Two of the 131 passengers sustained injuries, along with the fireman and two conductors. The only fatality was a woman on the street below, Marie-Augustine Aguilard, who was temporarily taking over her husband's work duty while he went out to get the newspapers. She was killed by falling masonry. The railway company later paid for her funeral and provided a pension to look after her two children. The accident was caused by a faulty Westinghouse brake and the engine driver, who was trying to make up lost time.
A conductor was given a 25-franc fine and the engine driver a 50-franc fine.

Replicas of the train crash are recreated outside the Mundo a Vapor ("Steam World") museum chain buildings in Brazil, in the southernmost state, Rio Grande do Sul, in the city of Canela.

Train services
From Paris Montparnasse train services depart to major French cities such as: Le Mans, Rennes, Saint-Brieuc, Brest, Saint-Malo, Vannes, Lorient, Quimper, Angers, Nantes, Saint-Nazaire, Tours, Poitiers, La Rochelle, Angoulême, Bordeaux, Toulouse, Bayonne and Granville. The station is also served by suburban trains heading to the west and south-west of Paris.

High speed services (TGV) Paris – Bordeaux – Dax – Lourdes – Tarbes
High speed services (TGV) Paris – Bordeaux – Dax – Bayonne – Biarritz – Hendaye
High speed services (TGV) Paris – Bordeaux – Agen – Toulouse
High speed services (TGV) Paris – Bordeaux – Arcachon
High speed services (TGV) Paris – Tours – Poitiers – Angoulême – Bordeaux
High speed services (TGV) Paris – Poitiers – La Rochelle
High speed services (TGV) Paris – Tours
High speed services (TGV) Paris – Le Mans – Rennes – St Brieuc – Brest
High speed services (TGV) Paris – Le Mans – Vannes – Lorient – Quimper
High speed services (TGV) Paris – Rennes – St Malo
High speed services (TGV) Paris – Le Mans – Rennes
High speed services (TGV) Paris – Nantes – St-Nazaire – Le Croisic
High speed services (TGV) Paris – Le Mans – Angers – Nantes
Discount High Speed Services (Ouigo TGV) Paris (Vaugirard.Montparnesse Hall 3) - Poitiers - Saint-Pierre-des-Corps- Angoulême - Bordeaux
Discount High Speed Services (Ouigo TGV) Paris (Vaugirard.Montparnesse Hall 3) - Le Mans - Laval - Rennes
Regional Services  (TER Normandie) Paris (Vaugirard.Montparnesse Hall 3) to Granville with numerous stops
Regional services (TER Centre) Paris – Versailles – Rambouillet – Chartres – Le Mans
Regional services (Transilien) Paris – Versailles – St-Quentin-en-Yvelines – Rambouillet
Regional services (Transilien) Paris – Versailles – Plaisir – Dreux
Regional services (Transilien) Paris – Versailles – Plaisir – Mantes-la-Jolie
Regional services (Transilien) Paris – Versailles – Plaisir

Lines serving this station
Adjacent metro station:
 Montparnasse – Bienvenüe

Nearby station:
 Pasteur

See also

List of Paris railway stations
Transportation in France
List of stations of the Paris RER
List of stations of the Paris Métro
Gare d'Austerlitz
Gare de l'Est
Gare de Lyon
Gare du Nord
Gare Saint-Lazare
Georges Méliès, who worked at the station later in his life.

References

External links

 
 
 Gare Montparnasse – current photographs and of the years 1900.
Satellite image from Google Maps
 Mundo a Vapor Museum The Brazilian museum which contains the 1895 derailment accident replica.

Railway termini in Paris
SNCF
Railway stations in France opened in 1840
Buildings and structures in the 15th arrondissement of Paris